QDGC - Quarter Degree Grid Cells (or QDS - Quarter degree Squares) are a way of dividing the longitude latitude degree square cells into smaller squares, forming in effect a system of geocodes. Historically QDGC has been used in a lot of African atlases. Several African biodiversity projects uses QDGC, among which The atlas of Southern African Birds is the most prominent one. In 2009 a paper by Larsen et al.  describes the QDGC standard in detail.

Mechanics 
The squares themselves are based on the degree squares covering earth. QDGC represents a way of making approximately equal area squares covering a specific area to represent specific qualities of the area covered. However, differences in area between 'squares' enlarge along with longitudinal distance and this can violate assumptions of many statistical analyses requiring truly equal-area grids. For instance species range modelling or estimates of ecological niche could be substantially affected if data were not appropriately transformed, e.g. projected onto a plane using a special projection.

Around the equator we have 360 longitudinal lines, and from the north to the south pole we have 180 latitudinal lines. Together this gives us 64800 segments or tiles covering earth. The form of the squares becomes more rectangular the longer north we come. At the poles they are not square or even rectangular at all, but end up in elongated triangles.

Each degree square is designated by a full reference to the main degree square. S01E010 is a reference to a square in Tanzania. S means the square is south of equator, and E means it is East of the zero meridian. The numbers refer to longitudinal and latitudinal degree.

A square with no sublevel reference is also called QDGC level 0. This is square based on a full degree longitude by a full degree latitude. The QDGC level 0 squares are themselves divided into four.

To get smaller squares the above squares are again divided in four - giving us a total of 16 squares within a degree square. The names for the new level of squares are named the same way. The full reference of a square could then be:

S01E010AD

The number of squares for each QDGC level can be calculated with this formula:

number of squares = (2d)2

(where d is QDGC level)

Table showing level, number of squares and an example reference:

To decide which name a specific longitude latitude value belongs to it is possible to use the code provided on this GitHub project:
QDGC on Github

Download shapefiles datasets  here:
Countries
Continents

See also
Geocode
Digital orthophoto quadrangle

References

External links
Related websites
Avian Demography Unit

Biogeography
Ornithology
Geocodes